Justice Gardner may refer to:

Ezekiel Gardner Jr., associate justice of the Rhode Island Supreme Court
John Gardner (Rhode Island governor), chief justice of the Superior Court of the Colony of Rhode Island and Providence Plantations
John P. Gardner, special associate justice of the South Carolina Supreme Court
Lucien D. Gardner, chief justice of the Alabama Supreme Court
William Gardner (Massachusetts judge), associate justice of the Massachusetts Supreme Judicial Court

See also
Justice Gardiner (disambiguation)